Christer Gustafsson (born 31 December 1987) is a Swedish footballer.

Career

IF Brommapojkarna
In December 2019, Gustafsson signed with IF Brommapojkarna.

References

External links 
 

Swedish footballers
Allsvenskan players
Superettan players
1987 births
Living people
Hammarby Fotboll players
Hammarby Talang FF players
IK Sirius Fotboll players
IF Brommapojkarna players
Association football midfielders
Footballers from Stockholm